The Suncorp Super Netball Leading Goalscorer Award is an annual Suncorp Super Netball award given to the player that scores the most goals in the Suncorp Super Netball regular season (i.e.: not including finals). The current holder of the award is Jhaniele Fowler, who scored 795 goals in the 2020 regular season.

Winners

References

Lead